The Five Trees in Paradise is an esoteric or allegorical image from the Coptic Gospel of Thomas, a collection of logia (sayings) of Jesus.

"Blessed is he who was before he came into being" is similar to other enigmatic statements commonly found in mysticism, and may refer to the benefits of self-awareness (knowledge of one's true nature) before developing one's ego-identity. "If you [listen], these stones will minister to you," may refer to "listening" to the true self within – accurately tracing the internal by observing the external — or it may mean that only through self-awareness are we able to understand Jesus' symbolic language and master external reality.

In the Acts of Thomas ch. 27, during an anointing ceremony, the apostle implores, "Come, elder of the five members, mind, thought, reflection, consideration, reason; communicate with these young men." According to Theodore Bar Konai, the five words for 'mind' are the equivalents of hauna (sanity), mad'a (reason), re'yana (mindfulness), mahshebhatha (imagination), tar'itha (intention) – considered the Five Manifestations of the Father of Greatness which may provide the clue to the meaning of the five trees.  These five would therefore be the causal factors in the experience of the Real.

Marvin Meyer writes: "The "five trees" in paradise are mentioned frequently in gnostic texts, ordinarily without explanation or elaboration. In Manichaean Psalm Book 161,17-29, it is said that various features of life and faith are put together in groups of five. This section opens with the statement, 'For [five] are the trees that are in paradise ... in summer and winter.' On the trees in paradise according to Genesis, see Genesis 2:9."

Senses
According to the Naassenes, "Paradise" in this allegory represents the human head. It has been suggested that the "five trees" represent the five human senses which produce one's internal worldview, knowledge of which is a requirement for purification and enlightenment. However, the body's five senses – representative of lower-level egoism and learned misperception — would more likely be considered an impediment to reunion with the divine.

Kabbalah
The "five trees" may relate to the Five Worlds of Jewish Kabbalah, which form a descending chain. Each of these worlds is associated with a "level" of the human soul, such that the spiritual progress of the soul upward toward unity with God mirrors an ascent through the astral worlds. From highest to lowest:

 Adam Kadmon ("primordial man"), associated with yechidah (oneness with God)
 Atziluth ("emanation"), associated with chayah (partaking of God)
 Beri'ah ("creation"), associated with neshamah (moral sense)
 Yetzirah ("formation"), associated with ruach (intellect)
 Asiyah ("action"), associated with nephesh (natural instinct)

Hindu parallels

There is a theory that Jesus traveled to India during his "missing years," and various Christian sects in India, such as the Saint Thomas Christians, trace their origins specifically to the Apostle Thomas. There are several places in Hindu mythology where "five trees" appear:

The Hindu gods' celestial abode, Svarga, features a garden (Nandana) with five trees, whose species may be identified as:

 Mandara (Erythrina stricta)
 Parijata (Nyctanthes arbor-tristis); the specific tree in the garden, 
 Samtanaka, "a tree of wonder having leaves which promote fertility in men"
 Haricandana (Santalum album), the sandalwood tree, which keeps away evil spirits
 Kalpavriksha, the tree of eternity, which arose from the churning of the ocean of milk and can grant wishes

Temples dedicated to Lord Shiva will also be surrounded by five species of sacred evergreen tree, as detailed in the Puranas: the Amala (Phyllanthus emblica), banyan (Ficus benghalensis), bel (Aegle marmelos), neem (Azadirachta indica), and pipal (Ficus religiosa).

Furthermore, "the flowers of five trees — asoka, mango, navamal lika (Ixora parviflora), pink lotus (Nelumbe nucifera), and blue lotus (Nymphae stellata) — adorn the tip of the bow of Kama, the god of love."

See also

References

External links 
 "Five" in Manichaean myth 
  Gospel of Thomas

Gnosticism
Plants in the Bible
Trees in mythology
5 (number)